Duck Creek is a river in Kent County in the U.S. state of Texas. It is a tributary of the Salt Fork Brazos River.

See also
List of rivers of Texas

References

USGS Hydrologic Unit Map - State of Texas (1974)

Brazos River
Rivers of Texas